James Newberger (born March 6, 1964) is an American politician who served as a member of the Minnesota House of Representatives from 2013 to 2019. A member of the Republican Party, he represented District 15B in the state's central part. He was the Republican nominee for the United States Senate in 2018, losing to incumbent Democrat Amy Klobuchar.

Education
Newberger attended St. Cloud State University, graduating with a B.A. in political science and mass communications.

Minnesota House of Representatives
Newberger was elected to the Minnesota House of Representatives in 2012.  He served three terms from 2013 to 2016 and served on the Jobs and Energy (Vice Chair), Environment and Natural Resources, Civil Law, Transportation Policy, and Public Safety committees.

On September 10, 2018, Newberger was riding on a trailer/float in the Carver County parade as a candidate for the U.S. Senate.  The tractor pulling the float malfunctioned, causing MN Secretary of State Candidate John Howe to be thrown to the pavement. Howe's campaign manager, Tim Droogsma, also fell off the tractor and was run over by the 2,800-pound trailer. Both men suffered injuries. Newberger, a retired paramedic, immediately responded and rendered aid to Howe and Droogsma until ambulances could arrive.

On January 23, 2017, Newberger immediately responded when Governor Mark Dayton collapsed during the State of the State Address. Newberger and Representative Jeff Backer rendered aid to Dayton.

Newberger was reprimanded by a judge for writing to encourage reconsideration of a judgment (worth roughly $250,000) against a donor to Newberger. Newberger defended his action as advocating for his constituents but said he would not act in a similar manner again. Minnesota judges may not consider communications made to them regarding cases without the presence and knowledge of both lawyers.

Electoral history

Personal life
Newberger is married to Michele Newberger. They have three daughters and reside in Becker, Minnesota.

References

External links

1964 births
21st-century American politicians
Living people
Republican Party members of the Minnesota House of Representatives
Paramedics
People from Becker, Minnesota
St. Cloud State University alumni
Candidates in the 2018 United States Senate elections